"It's Still Rock and Roll to Me" is a song written and performed by Billy Joel, from the hit album Glass Houses. Released in 1980, the song peaked at number 1 on the Billboard Hot 100 charts for two weeks, from July 19 through August 1, 1980. The song spent 11 weeks in the top 10 of the Billboard Hot 100 and was the 7th biggest hit of 1980 according to American Top 40.

The song conveys Joel's criticisms of the music industry and press, commenting on new musical styles of the time such as new wave being mere rehashes of older musical styles. It also addresses changing trends and attitudes of the era.

The single eventually reached Platinum status from the RIAA for sales of over 1 million copies in the United States. Pop rock musician Drake Bell covered the song in 2014 on his rockabilly album Ready Steady Go!.

History and composition 
Joel wrote the song in response to critics that often described his music as adult contemporary, middle-of-the-road pop. He felt that new styles of music were not particularly different to older styles of music unlike what was being marketed, especially viewing new wave as akin to older genres such as power pop and rock and roll, commenting in an interview with Rolling Stone that "new wave songs, it seems, can only be about two and a half minutes long... only a certain number of instruments can be played on the record - usually a very few... only a certain amount of production is allowed or can be heard... the sound has to be limited to what you can hear in a garage... a return to that sound is all that’s going on now".

The song is in 4/4 time, is at 144bpm and is written in C Major. It features a saxophone solo before the final verse. According to drummer Liberty DeVitto in an interview, the sound engineer for the song had him tune his snare drum extremely low so that it would "flop" when he played it. The "miracle mile" mentioned in the lyrics refers to a road host to many stores in Manhasset and Great Neck Long Island, the reference to white wall tires is from the store Best Tire and new speakers is a reference to Berliner Stereo, all locations near the area where Joel spent his childhood.

Critical reception 
In a review made a week later after single release, Billboard editors noticed the laconicism of backing support and Joel's vocal that made the song sparkling. Tom Breihan of Stereogum, in a retrospective review, was mixed, referring to it as "a sharp, well-written song" but commenting that it "never takes off".  Cash Box said that Joel "throws a few slyly humorous stones...at the present new wave fad" and that the song includes "a torrid sax break."  Record World said that "Joel surveys the current rock scene with sharp vocal phrasing & a pulsating rhythm, driving home his pointed lyrical observations."

Personnel 
 Billy Joel – lead and backing vocals, acoustic piano, electric piano
 Dave Brown – electric guitar
 Russell Javors – electric guitar
 Doug Stegmeyer – bass
 Liberty DeVitto – drums, percussion
 Richie Cannata – saxophone solo

Chart history

Weekly charts

Year-end charts

All-time charts

Certifications and sales

Music video
A music video for the song was made, showing Joel performing the song live with his band. According to his band members, the song vocals were performed live by Joel during the video's filming.

Parody
"Weird Al" Yankovic recorded a parody of the song entitled "It's Still Billy Joel to Me" in 1980, popularized on the Dr. Demento radio program. It was not released, either as a single or an album track. Yankovic commented, "I wrote that in 1980, but even by 1983 (when my first album came out) it felt a bit dated. Also, we figured that Billy wasn’t very likely to give us his blessing on that one anyway, so we never even bothered asking."

See also
List of Billboard Hot 100 number-one singles of 1980

References

External links 
 Song Facts on It's Still Rock and Roll to Me.
  / ⒞1980 Sony BMG channel

1979 songs
1980 singles
Billy Joel songs
Billboard Hot 100 number-one singles
Cashbox number-one singles
RPM Top Singles number-one singles
Songs written by Billy Joel
Song recordings produced by Phil Ramone
Columbia Records singles
Songs about rock music
American new wave songs